Lists of battles contain links to sets of articles on battles. They may be organized alphabetically, by era, by conflict, by participants or location, or by death toll. See :Category:Battles for a complete list of articles on battles.

Alphabetical list
 List of battles (alphabetical)

Chronological

By era 
 List of battles before 301
 List of battles 301–1300
 List of battles 1301–1600
 List of battles 1601–1800
 List of battles 1801–1900
 List of battles 1901–2000
 List of battles in the 21st century

By war 
 List of battles of the Eighty Years' War (1566–1648)
 Lists of battles of the French Revolutionary Wars and Napoleonic Wars (1792–1815)
 List of American Civil War battles (1861–1865)
 List of costliest American Civil War land battles
 List of naval battles of the American Civil War
 List of World War II battles (1939–1945)
 Lists of allied military operations of the Vietnam War (1955–1975)

By death toll 
 List of battles by casualties
 List of battles and other violent events by death toll
 List of events named massacres

By geographic location

By participant

By state participant

By participating commander 

 List of Ottoman battles in which the sultan participated
 Military career of Napoleon Bonaparte § Battle record summary
 Military career of George Washington § Summaries of Washington's Revolutionary War battles

By type 
Battles are generally presumed to have been land/field battles, unless otherwise stated.
 Lists of aerial operations and battles
 Air raids on Australia, 1942–1943
 Air raids on Hong Kong
 Aircraft carrier operations during World War II
 List of air operations during the Battle of Europe
 List of Allied attacks on the German battleship Tirpitz
 List of strategic bombing over Germany in World War II
 List of strategic bombing over the United Kingdom in World War II
 List of amphibious assault operations
 List of military operations on ice
 List of naval battles
 List of naval and land-based operations in the Pacific Theater during World War II
 List of sieges

See also
 List of battles and other violent events by death toll

 List of orders of battle
 List of number of conflicts per year
 Africa :
 List of conflicts in Africa (Military history of Africa)
 List of modern conflicts in North Africa (Maghreb)
 Conflicts in the Horn of Africa (East region)
 Americas :
 List of conflicts in North America
 List of conflicts in Central America
 List of conflicts in South America
 Asia :
 List of conflicts in Asia
 List of conflicts in the Near East
 List of conflicts in the Middle East
 List of modern conflicts in the Middle East
 Europe :
 List of conflicts in Europe
 Post-Cold War European conflicts
 Ongoing conflicts around the World :
 List of ongoing armed conflicts
 Ongoing military conflicts

External links and references
 World History Database, Alphabetic Listing of Battles Index of World battles. Archived from the original.
 Radford, Robert, Great Historical Battles.  An extensive list of important battles and influential leaders, from -490 BC to  present times.

 
Military lists
 
 
History-related lists
Military history of Asia
History of the Middle East